Neville Hawkes (22 April 1940 – 17 December 1989) was a South African cricketer. He played in six first-class matches for Border from 1960/61 to 1962/63.

See also
 List of Border representative cricketers

References

External links
 

1940 births
1989 deaths
South African cricketers
Border cricketers